Populus ilicifolia (Tana River poplar) is a species of poplar in the family Salicaceae. It is found in Kenya and Tanzania from 1°N to 3°S latitude, 37°E to 41°E latitude, at altitudes of 10–1,200 m; it is the southernmost member of its genus in the world. It is threatened by habitat loss. It requires a riverine climate. 

It is an evergreen tree growing to 30 m tall with a trunk up to 1.5 m diameter. It is used locally as an avenue tree, and its timber is used for making beehives, mortars, dugout canoes and fences.

References

ilicifolia
Flora of Kenya
Flora of Tanzania
Trees of Africa
Tana River (Kenya)
Vulnerable flora of Africa
Taxonomy articles created by Polbot